The 1992 City of Dundee District Council election took place in April 1992 to elect members of City of Dundee Council, as part of that year's Scottish local elections.

Election results

References

1992
1992 Scottish local elections
20th century in Dundee